Markus Croonen is a retired German football goalkeeper.

References

External links
 

1964 births
Living people
VfL Bochum II players
VfL Bochum players
SC Preußen Münster players
FSV Frankfurt players
Association football goalkeepers
German footballers